Bedford Creek Bridge is a historic stone arch bridge located at Hounsfield in Jefferson County, New York. It was constructed in 1825 and spans the Bedford Creek.  It is a vernacular, semi-circular stone arch bridge, with a span of 18 feet, 6 inches, and measuring 24 feet long and 21 feet wide.

It was listed on the National Register of Historic Places in 1989.

References

Road bridges on the National Register of Historic Places in New York (state)
Bridges completed in 1825
Transportation buildings and structures in Jefferson County, New York
Road bridges in New York City
National Register of Historic Places in Jefferson County, New York
Stone arch bridges in the United States